St. Lazarus' Church is a historic church in São Lázaro, Macau, China. Built between 1557 and 1560, it is one of the oldest churches in Macau and located on Rua de João de Almeida.

It currently serves as the main church of the St. Lazarus parish. The church was completely rebuilt in 1885, although the Cross of Hope from the original chapel is located in the forecourt of the current structure.

Clergy
Parish Priest: Canon Joao Evangelista Lau Him Sang

Assistant Parish Priest: Fr. Edgar Palomo Passaporte SSP

See also
 Religion in Macau

References

Roman Catholic churches in Macau
Religious organizations established in the 1550s
Roman Catholic churches completed in 1560
16th-century Roman Catholic church buildings in China
1560 establishments in China
1560 establishments in the Portuguese Empire
16th-century establishments in Macau
Portuguese colonial architecture in China